Susitna Glacier is an alpine or valley glacier in the Alaska Range. Susitna Glacier flows over a seismically active area. The 7.9-magnitude 2002 Denali earthquake struck the region in November 2002. The earthquake initiated with thrust movement on the previously unrecognized Susitna Glacier fault.

See also
 Susitna River
 Matanuska-Susitna Valley
 2002 Denali earthquake

References

Glaciers of Alaska
Glaciers of Denali Borough, Alaska
Glaciers of Matanuska-Susitna Borough, Alaska
Glaciers of Southeast Fairbanks Census Area, Alaska
Glaciers of Unorganized Borough, Alaska